The Alabama Department of Transportation (ALDOT) is the government agency responsible for transportation infrastructure in Alabama. The Department is organized into five geographic regions, with a Central Office located in Montgomery, AL. The Central Office is organized into the Office of the Transportation Director and the Office of the Chief Engineer. The five Region Engineers report to the director and Deputy Director, Operations. The organization of the various bureaus and offices are designed to report to the director and the deputy directors, Chief Engineer, or the Assistant Chief Engineers. The Department has several boards and committees that operate either within a bureau or as a cooperative effort among several bureaus or regions.

References

External links

State agencies of Alabama
Transportation in Alabama
State departments of transportation of the United States